Slavko Špan (25 May 1938 – 12 June 2021) was a Slovene middle-distance runner.

He competed in the men's 3000 metres steeplechase at the 1964 Summer Olympics, but did not progress beyond the qualifying round. In 1962, he finished the men's 3000 metres steeplechase race in 9th place at the European Athletics Championships in Belgrade.

References

External links
 

1938 births
2021 deaths
Athletes (track and field) at the 1964 Summer Olympics
Slovenian male middle-distance runners
Slovenian male steeplechase runners
Olympic athletes of Yugoslavia
Sportspeople from Ljubljana